
Dies Irae is the fourth and final studio album by Devil Doll, released in February 1996.

A concept by Mr. Doctor, it is inspired by the life and music of George Harvey Bone, the poems of Edgar Allan Poe, Emily Brontë, Emily Dickinson and Isidore Ducasse.

The lyrics contains multiple references to the poem "The Conqueror Worm" by E. A. Poe (with the entire final stanza of the poem reproduced almost verbatim). The sample used at the beginning "Part 12" is from the film The Night of the Hunter, and is the character Pearl Harper (played by Sally Jane Bruce) singing.

Track listing

"Part 18" ends at 2:52 and is followed by 23:20 of silence. A hidden track then starts playing. This song is sometimes called "Part 19".

Personnel

Line up
 Mr. Doctor – vocals
 Francesco Carta – piano
 Sasha Olenjuk – violin
 Roman Ratej – drums
 Bor Zuljan – guitar
 Jani Hace – bass
 Davor Klaric – keyboards
 Michel Fantini Jesurum – pipe organ

Guests
Norina Radovan – soprano
Drago Ivanuša – accordion
Paolo Zizich – backing vocals
The "Gloria Chorus" conducted by Marian Bunic
And the Slovenian philharmonic orchestra soloist:
Igor Skerianec – cello
Irina Kevorkova – 2nd violin leader
Fraim Gashi – double bass

Devil Doll (Slovenian band) albums
1996 albums
Albums recorded in Slovenia